The Federal Department for Media Harmful to Young Persons ( or BPjM) is an upper-level German federal censorship agency subordinate to the Federal Ministry of Family Affairs, Senior Citizens, Women and Youth. It is responsible for examining and censoring media works suspected to be harmful to young people. These works are added to an official list – a process known as Indizierung (indexing) in German - as part of child protection efforts. The decision to index a work has a variety of legal implications; chiefly, restrictions on sale and advertisement.

Legal basis
The basic rights of freedom of expression and artistic freedom in Article 5 of the German Grundgesetz are not guaranteed without limits. Along with the "provisions of general laws" and "provisions [...] in the right of personal honour", "provisions for the protection of young persons" may restrict freedom of expression (Article 5 Paragraph 2).

The Protection of Young Persons Act, which came into effect in April 2003, is one such provision. It superseded the Gesetz über die Verbreitung jugendgefährdender Schriften (Law on the Distribution of Works Harmful to Young Persons) as the legal basis for the restriction of freedom of expression when applied to physical media (printed works, videos, CD-ROMs, etc.).

The Jugendmedienschutz-Staatsvertrag (State Treaty on Media Protection of Young Persons) between the different Länder came into effect on the same day as the Jugendschutzgesetz and regulates the distribution of broadcasts and virtual media. It also provides a legal basis for the actions of the BPjM.

History
The original Bundesprüfstelle für jugendgefährdende Schriften (BPjS, Federal Department for Works Harmful to Young Persons) was established on 18 May 1954, after the Gesetz über die Verbreitung jugendgefährdender Schriften was adopted on 9 June 1953. The presiding officers of the BPjS have been:
1954–1966: Robert Schilling
1966–1969: Werner Jungeblodt (Deputy: Eduard Tack)
1969–1991: Rudolf Stefen (Deputies: Elke Monssen-Engberding, later Gerhard Adams)
1991–2016: Elke Monssen-Engberding (Deputies: Dr. Bettina Brockhorst, later Petra Meier)
Since April 2016: Martina Hannak-Meinke

The first session deciding upon applications requesting the indexing of materials took place on 9 July 1954. The first two works indexed by the BPjS were Tarzan comics. The rationale for this was that they would affect young people in a "nerve-inflaming and brutalising way" and "transport them into an unreal world of lies". Such works were supposedly "the result of a degenerate imagination", which is considered an insult to the comics' illustrator at the time, John Celardo.

In 1978, the number and type of institutions which could petition for a work to be indexed was widened considerably. Since then, not only the higher authorities with responsibility for young people in the Länder (states), but also the youth welfare offices of individual Kreise (districts) have been authorized to submit applications. The number of applications for indexing has multiplied significantly as a result of this.

Following the Erfurt massacre (a Columbine-like shooting at a school in Erfurt), the Jugendschutzgesetz was passed in June 2002, replacing the Gesetz über die Verbreitung jugendgefährdender Schriften and the Gesetz zum Schutz der Jugend in der Öffentlichkeit (Law for Protection of Young Persons in Public Places). It came into effect on 1 April 2003.

The change in the law clarified the area over which the Bundesprüfstelle has authority. New forms of media such as websites and computer software were within its jurisdiction. As a result of these new powers the organisation's name was changed to the current Bundesprüfstelle für jugendgefährdende Medien. As previously, an examination order can result from the application of a state youth protection agency or from the request of a non-governmental youth organisation.

For video games, the new law also made the ratings of the USK compulsory. Games that have been given a rating by this organisation can no longer be put on the index.

Role and responsibilities
The BPjM has the following responsibilities:
 the placing of media harmful to young people under legally-enforceable prohibition upon the application of ministers for youth and youth welfare offices, so that these media are accessible only to adults but not to children
 the promotion of media education which promotes human worth
 the encouragement of public awareness about media protection for young people

§ 18 Paragraph 1 JuSchG (Youth Protection Law) defines jugendgefährdend as that which is harmful "to the development of children or young people or to their education as autonomous and socially-compatible individuals". Media that are "immoral, brutalizing, or which provoke violence, crime or racial hatred" are named as examples of this.

Under § 15 Paragraph 2 JSchG, certain types of content are subject to restricted distribution by virtue of the law on account of their obvious harm to young people, without the need to add them to the Index. These include:
 content which is proscribed by the criminal law such as Volksverhetzung (incitement to hate or violence against a group of people), instructions on how to commit crime, glorification or trivialization of violence, incitement to racial hatred and pornography
 content which glorifies war
 content which depicts minors in an unnatural/harmful situation

However, as often it may not be immediately apparent whether a particular work has content as described in § 15, 2 JSchG, the Bundesprüfstelle is able to index such media for the purpose of clarification. The Bundesprüfstelle has consequently indexed works which deny the Holocaust, which would be indictable as Volksverhetzung or as bringing the memory of the deceased into disrepute, when the public prosecutor's office was not able to proceed further at that point.

Upon the application (Antrag) of a youth welfare office or at the request of an accredited non-governmental youth organisation, the BPjM examines whether a written work, film, computer game or other media product has content they consider harmful to young persons. If an application is made by a government body, the BPjM must always examine the media work. If a non-governmental body makes a request, the BPjM can decide itself if it needs to take action. No organization or individual other than the prescribed government bodies may make an Antrag. In practice applications are normally made by the youth welfare offices.

The indexing process
The authors, producers or rightsholders of the work in question are notified of the application or request for indexing. They have the right to a legal hearing.

The Bundesprüfstelle may not continue with the indexing process, if one of the following requirements if met:
 A work has been rated by the Freiwillige Selbstkontrolle der Filmwirtschaft (the film industry body which practises voluntary rating of movies) and did not receive a Nicht freigegeben unter 18 Jahren rating. As of April 2003, this particular rating is no longer issued. The new Keine Jugendfreigabe rating has been added instead, but has stricter rules as it cannot be indexed. Movies rated Nicht freigegeben unter 18 Jahren before that date can still get this rating when a new label releases such a movie and therefore has to apply for a re-rating.
 A work has been rated by the Unterhaltungssoftware Selbstkontrolle (the software industry body which practises voluntary rating of entertainment software) since 1 April 2003.

The decision-making panel
The decision whether a media work is harmful to young people is taken by the Zwölfer-Gremium (Panel of Twelve) or the Dreier-Gremium (Panel of Three). On these panels, youth protection agencies, the arts and business are represented by honorary assessors. The members of the panel act independently and not as directed by the interests they represent.

The Zwölfer-Gremium consists of:
the Presiding Officer (or Deputy Presiding Officer) and assessors representing:
art
literature
the book trade and publishers
the suppliers of videos and the telecommunications industry
voluntary-sector youth organisations
public-sector youth organisations
teaching staff
the churches
three representatives from the ministries responsible for youth protection in the sixteen Bundesländer, who serve in rotation.

The hearing, which representatives of the work in question can take part in, is oral and not open to the public. However, the presiding officer can allow third parties to attend the hearing. As in the courts, transcripts of the hearing are not published, but the written reasons for a decision can also be requested by those not involved in the proceedings. The names of the assessors are disclosed to those involved in the proceedings, and are also listed in both the transcript and the decision to index. If those not involved in the proceedings request the decision to index, any personal data (of assessors and also of any companies or lawyers involved) is removed.

The decision to index requires a majority of two thirds of the votes. If this majority is not reached, the indexing is rejected. In the event that the Bundesprüfstelle holds a meeting with the legal quorum of nine people, a qualified majority of seven must vote to index or the application will be rejected.

The Dreier-Gremium has jurisdiction only in cases where harm to young people is obvious. At least one assessor on the panel must be a representative of art, literature, the book trade and publishing, or the video or telecommunications industry. An application for indexing will be accepted only if the panel votes unanimously.

The person responsible for an indexed work can file suit against the decision to index in an administrative court.

The List of Media Harmful to Young People
The List of Media Harmful to Young People (colloquially known as the Index) is published only for physical media (those whose content is stored as an object rather than virtually). The list of virtual media is not published so as to avoid advertising these works. It is technically illegal for third parties to publish the list, and the only sanctioned lists can be found in the official publications of the BPjM. The lists are published in BPjM-Aktuell, a quarterly journal which costs €11 per issue. Nonetheless, there are numerous lists available on the Internet that reveal which media has been indexed or confiscated.

While these online lists are technically illegal, their right to exist and how the publication has yet been untested in court, as only a small number of them have shut down voluntarily after receiving warnings from a number of non-governmental youth protection associations. As such, it is as yet unknown whether a ban on the publication of these lists could be a violation of the Youth Protection Act. If it is not, then such a ban would not be permitted under article 5 of the German constitution.

Under the new Jugendschutzgesetz, a decision to index remains valid for 25 years. After that, the work is automatically removed from the Index. If the BPjM is of the opinion that there is still a risk of harm to young people, it must begin the legal proceedings afresh. After a popular movie has been removed from the index, there is usually a label that has it re-rated by the FSK (which does not rate indexed movies). Most previously indexed movies get an FSK 16 rating. As commercial interest in old video games is usually very low (see abandonware), there is little interest in paying for a re-rating by the USK.

In the event that the material or legal situation changes, the rightsholders for an indexed work can apply for the proceedings to be re-opened under Article 51 of the Verwaltungsverfahrengesetz (the Administrative Proceedings Law) with the aim of removing the work from the list.

The List in detail
The List is subdivided into various sublists, and these in turn are subdivided into various indexes:

Figures are from 2004.

Legal consequences
The legal consequences of a work being listed on the Index are enumerated in § 15 JuSchG:
It must not be sold, provided or otherwise made accessible to minors.
It must not be displayed where it can be seen by minors. This would, for example, include playing an indexed game in the presence of minors (e.g. streaming gameplay over the Internet).
It must be sold within a shop in an area accessible only to adults ("under the counter"). In general, selling indexed titles per mail order is illegal, however, it is permissible if the package may be handed over only to a specified adult, who has to present their identification.
It must not be rented out, except in a shop inaccessible to minors.
It must not be imported by mail order. In this case, an adult buyer (importer) is not subject to penalties, if they themselves have no intentions of further disseminating it to others or minors.
It must not be advertised or announced in a place where the announcement or advertisement could be seen by minors.
If it is for one of the above six causes, production, acquiring, and holding in stores are subject to penalties.

Indexed content of lists A and C can, however, be advertised and sold to adults on the Internet, if it is technically ensured that minors do not have access to the content (closed user groups). Media on lists B and D may be disseminated under the aforementioned conditions, however, they should not be distributed through broadcasting system, including the Internet.

It is a matter of dispute whether criticism or discussion of indexed works is allowed in works that are accessible to young people. Public prosecutors have not been unanimous in this regard, but publishers tend to lean on the side of safety, for example, in the German version of Marc Saltzman's Game Design: Secret of the Sages, the titles of indexed games were replaced by random strings matching only their first letters and lengths.

Pornographic content on the Internet is legal only if technical measures prohibit minors from getting access to the object (AVS = Age Verification System or Adult-Check-System).

Criticism
The BPjM has drawn criticism for de facto censorship, paternalism and restricting the freedom of speech and of the press on the following grounds:

 After a work has been indexed, in practice, it also becomes more difficult for adults to get access to it, as indexed works must not be advertised and may be sold by mail order only under strict conditions. The sale of such works is therefore often not profitable and the work thus disappears from the market.
 Journalists may carry out self-censorship and choose not to mention the work to avoid possible legal trouble.
 Germany is the only Western democracy with an organization like the BPjM. The rationales for earlier decisions to add works to the index are, in retrospect, incomprehensible reactions to moral panics. An example of this is the controversy about the game River Raid.

The counter-argument states that the advertising ban on indexed works is not the aim of the decision to index, but its legal consequence. The BPjM sees it as its responsibility to use the decision to index works harmful to young people in order to raise awareness that there is content which is unsuitable and damaging for minors. This should consequently encourage public debate about the depiction of violence in the media or about other matters of concern.

In practice this debate seldom takes place. One reason for this is the legal uncertainty as to whether a critical discussion of an indexed work is legally permissible or whether it infringes the advertising ban. This can be traced back to the differing positions of various public prosecutor's offices and a clarification of the legal position by law enforcement agencies would consequently be helpful.

The critique that the BPjM is an organisation unique to Germany ignores the fact that other western countries also have laws and mechanisms, albeit different in scope and practice, to prevent, for example, the sale of pornography to minors, Holocaust denial or racist literature and hate speech.

The nature of the BPjM'''s judgements has altered over the decades and been modified in accordance with changing public opinion. Decisions to index from the 1950s and 1960s, and indeed those from the early days of computer and video games, are unlikely to be made today. Regardless, many of these decisions are still in effect today. Consequently, the time period of 25 years that media is retained on the index is of high controversy.

In recent times, it has become more prevalent for digital games on PC to use license keys, while an online activation has to be undertaken to use the license. Many publishers deem it necessary to restrict activation out of Germany for certain games. This leaves German adults without the option to import said games, while consoles do not have those kind of restrictions. So far, importing console games has not led to an incrimination of any publisher. While indexing keeps a larger portion of the German population (especially parents) in ignorance over indexed media, due to the Internet, it is easier than ever for minors to inform themselves about new media which might be indexed in Germany and thus be of more interest to them. The indexing process is thus often labelled as outdated, useless for parents and society as a whole. Since it seems to only just provide a thin veil of false security for youth protection, it leads to a disproportionate factual restriction of adults' freedom of information.

Other restriction mechanisms 
Indexing is not the only mechanism in use in Germany by which broader circulation of certain media works is prevented. Works may also receive a confiscation order by a court when certain articles of the Strafgesetzbuch apply to them, such as glorification of violence or denial of the Holocaust. Confiscation results in a nationwide ban on its sale even to adults; the mere possession of such material remains legal (with the exception of child pornography).

A well-known example of a confiscated work is Wolfenstein 3D, which was confiscated due to the use of Nazi symbols such as swastikas. Since it was initially not been clarified in court whether video games constitute a form of art, the same has happened to later games in the franchise and any other computer game displaying Nazi symbols, including those that portray Nazism in a negative light. These rulings were later loosened in August 2018 as a result of a ruling from April that same year. The web-based game Bundesfighter II Turbo was released prior to the September 2017 elections, which included parodies of the candidates fighting each other. This included the portrayals of Angela Merkel as a sea monster and Alexander Gauland, who had a special move that involved Swastika imagery. When this was noticed by public authorities, they began the prosecution of the game in December, submitting it to the Public Prosecutor General's office for review based on the Wolfenstein 3D decision. The Attorney General declined to consider the game illegal under Strafgesetzbuch section 86a, stating that the 1998 ruling was outdated. Since then, the USK had adopted age ratings for video games and that there was no reason not to consider video games as art within the social adequacy clause. As a result, the Supreme Youth Protection Authority of the Federal States adapted the Attorney General's ruling to be applicable for all video games within Germany and subsequently, the USK announced this change in August 2018. The USK reviews all games to judge if the use of imagery under Section 86a remains within the social adequacy clause and deny ratings to those that fail to meet this allowance.

ReferencesThis article is primarily a translation of the equivalent German-language article as of 1 September 2005.BPjM-Aktuell, Amtliches Mitteilungsblatt der Bundesprüstelle für jugendgefährdende Medien (BPjM),  (print edition),  (digital edition)

External links

English
English-language information page of the official website
Computer Games on the Index List

German
Official website of the Bundesprüfstelle für jugendgefährdende Medien
Das saubere Dutzend: Report on the Zwölfer-Gremium from Süddeutsche Zeitung on 23 June 2004
50 Jahre gegen "Schmutz und Schund": Report on the 50th anniversary of the BPjM from Telepolis on 10 May 2004
Computer sind Waffen: Part 1 of a two-part report on the work of the then BPjS from Telepolis on 30 October
Kinder sind Pornos: Part 2 of a two-part report on the work of the then BPjS from Telepolis'' on 1 November 2000

Censorship in Germany
German federal agencies
Mass media in Germany
Federal authorities in Bonn
Youth in Germany